Route 16 is a primary state route connecting Middletown and Colchester via Route 66. It begins in East Hampton at Route 66 then has an interchange with Route 2 in Colchester. It then runs through Colchester center, then goes to the outskirts of Lebanon town as a rural collector road. Route 16 ends at Route 207 in Lebanon.

Route description
Route 16 begins at a junction with Route 66 in the Cobalt section of East Hampton. It proceeds easterly through the town, intersecting Route 196 before entering the town of Colchester.  In the village of Westchester, it intersects Route 149.  It then meets Route 2 at Exit 18 before reaching Colchester center.  Here it duplexes with Connecticut Route 85 for 0.07 miles, then continues northeasterly toward Lebanon, where it end at a junction with Route 207.

The portion between Route 66 and Route 85 is known as the "Henry Champion Highway".

History

 1933-34: Commissioned between Route 66 (then known as Route 14) in East Hampton and Route 85 in Colchester
 1963: Extended to Lebanon

Junction list

References

External links

016
Transportation in Middlesex County, Connecticut
Transportation in New London County, Connecticut